Buq Gosar() is a town in Hiran Region .

Overview
Buq Gosar located at 48 km (30 mi) West of Baladweyn City

References

Populated places in Hiran, Somalia